Zahra Rahnavard (born Zohreh Kazemi; 19 August 1945) is an Iranian academic, artist and politician. Rahnavard is a university professor, artist, and intellectual who was under house arrest from February 2011 to May 2018. In 2009, Foreign Policy magazine named her one of the world's most distinguished thinkers. She is the wife of former Iran Prime Minister Mir Hussein Musavi. In part of her work, she has underlined the need for men to respect the laws of the hijab in the same way as women, as well as a general activist for women's rights in the Middle East.

Early life
Rahnavard was born in Boroojerd, Iran. Her father Haj-Fathali was a Sh'ia and anti-Communist. After hearing of a gathering of Sh'ia clerics in Iran, Haj-Fathali emigrated to Khomein, Markazi Province where Zahra was raised. Zahra Rahnavard earned her bachelor and master's degrees in art and architecture from University of Tehran. She also has master's and PhD degrees from Islamic Azad University in Political science.

Career

Rahnavard was among the early revolutionaries against the Shah. In the last years of the Shah, she was close to Ali Shariati, a dissident Islamist leader. Rahnavard along with former President Rouhani and Mr. Mir-Hossein Mousavi proposed and pioneered the mandatory Hijab which went into effect shortly after the revolution.

Rahnavard served as the Chancellor of Alzahra University in Tehran from 1998 to 2006, and as a Political Adviser to the former Iranian President Mohammad Khatami. Rahnavard was the first Iranian woman appointed as a chancellor of a university since the Iranian Revolution of 1979. She was nominated to this post by former Minister of Science, Research and Technology, Mostafa Moin. After the election of president Mahmoud Ahmadinejad in 2005 and the purging of reformist officials from the government, Rahnavard was removed (or resigned) from her position as the Chancellor of Al-zahra University in 2006, replaced by Mahboubeh Mobasheri.

As the head of the Women's Social and Cultural Council, established in 1989, as one of seven government committees exploring various social issues, Rahnavard has called for these committees to be more equally represented by women members and has been an outspoken critic of the government's failure to accord women what, in her opinion, are their legitimate social and civil rights under the Qu’ran.

She was an active member of her husband Mir-Hossein Mousavi's campaign when Mousavi entered the 2009 presidential election. Now she is a member of The Green Path of Hope and is one of the Leaders of Opposition. Rahnavard is also the author of 15 books.

Personal life
Rahnavard is the wife of Mir-Hossein Mousavi, the former Prime Minister of Iran and had three daughters: Kokab, Narges and Zahra. She and Mousavi married on 18 September 1969. They are now on a house confinement.

References

External links

1945 births
Living people
University of Tehran alumni
Islamic Azad University alumni
Iranian Green Movement
Iranian women writers
21st-century Iranian women politicians
21st-century Iranian politicians
Iranian women academics
Academic staff of the Islamic Azad University, Central Tehran Branch
Academic staff of Al-Zahra University
Iranian prisoners and detainees
Presidential advisers of Iran
Association of the Women of the Islamic Republic politicians
Proponents of Islamic feminism
People who have been placed under house arrest in Iran
Recipients of the Order of Culture and Art
Spouses of prime ministers of Iran